Course Hero is an American education technology website company based in Redwood City, California which operates an online "pay to use" learning platform for students to access course-specific study resources. Subscription is required for students to use the platform.

The crowdsourced learning platform contains practice problems, study guides, infographics, class notes, step-by-step explanations, essays, lab reports, videos, user-submitted questions paired with answers from tutors, and original materials created and uploaded by educators. Users either buy a subscription or upload original documents to receive unlocks that are used to view and download full Course Hero documents.

History 
Course Hero was founded by Andrew Grauer at Cornell University in 2006 for college students to share lectures, class notes, exams and assignments.

In November 2014, the company raised $15 million in Series A Funding, with investors that included GSV Capital and IDG Capital. Seed investors SV Angel and Maveron also participated. In February 2020, the company raised a further $10 million in Series B Funding, valuing the company at over $1 billion. The Series B round was led by NewView Capital, whose founder and managing partner, Ravi Viswanathan, joined Course Hero’s board of directors. NewView Capital also contributed $30 million in what’s known as an employee tender offer, a process by which NewView purchased company shares directly from Course Hero employees.

Course Hero acquired Symbolab, a mathematics problem solver, in October 2020, and acquired   LitCharts, a literature guide resource, in June 2021. Terms of these acquisitions were not disclosed. 

In December 2021, the company received a $380 million Series C at a $3.6 billion valuation. This financing was led by Wellington Management and included investors such as Sequoia Capital Global Equities, OMERS growth equity, and D1 Capital Partners.

Controversy

Subscribers can download complete papers that were submitted by previous students and submit them as their own work. Additionally, the site allows students to upload homework and get completed work solutions from the site's contracted workers. Course Hero gets content for free from its users and charges an annual fee of $83.40, or a monthly fee of $19.95.

Copyright concerns
The documents uploaded for sale are frequently the intellectual property of faculty members, not of the students who post them/sell them. Course Hero's Use Policy states that users must be authorized to post the file, however Course Hero does not verify this or notify copyright holders prior to submissions being uploaded. These files include exams and their keys, quizzes and their keys, study guides written by instructors.

To protect the rights of the copyright holders, Course Hero must remove infringing content in accordance with the Digital Millennium Copyright Act after receiving a takedown notice from the copyright owner. The University of California provides guidance to instructors regarding language to include in course materials that may prevent uploading to Course Hero, as well as language to assert copyright and discourage students from uploading.

However, the process to remove copyrighted material is burdensome and discourages people from following through on such claims. According to some, the sheer volume of material held by Course Hero makes the prospect of takedown requests unlikely since professors must submit a lengthy request for each individual document uploaded.

In March 2022, an assistant professor of business at Chapman University sued students for posting portions of his midterm and final course exams on Course Hero.

Faculty at Embry-Riddle University developed a search tool called CourseVillian, which searches Course Hero for documents and other artifacts originating from their own university's courses. It identified over 200,000 such artifacts. The tool automatically partially populates take-down request documents, to aid university staff in asking Course Hero to remove their own work from the web site.

Personal and Sensitive Information
Student papers uploaded to Course Hero sometimes contain personal or sensitive information, which might then be shared with other users of the site. However when users register for Course Hero they grant the company a perpetual license to use the uploaded material.

References

External links
 

Educational technology companies of the United States
Companies based in Redwood City, California
Software companies based in the San Francisco Bay Area
Education companies established in 2006
Internet properties established in 2006
Subscription services